Live – Iowa State University 1987 is a 2009 live album by blues singer Long John Baldry. It was recorded in 1985 and broadcast on the performance network in 1987. The concert finally saw a DVD release in 2004, which was remastered and re-issued in 2008. It was released on CD in 2009. The version of "Don't Try To Lay No Boogie Woogie On The King of Rock 'n' Roll" featured on the CD has had its spoken intro ("Conditional Discharge") removed. This intro can be found on both DVDs.

Track listing 

 "Goin' Down Slow" (St. Louis Jimmy Oden)
 "I'm Ready" (Willie Dixon)
 "Everyday (I Have The Blues)"
 "It Ain't Easy" (Ron Davies)
 "Respect"
 "You Make Me Feel Like a Natural Woman"
 "Iko Iko"
 "Don't Try To Lay No Boogie Woogie on The King of Rock 'n' Roll" (Jeff Thomas)

Personnel 

 Long John Baldry
 Kathi McDonald
 Joseph Ingraio
 David Norris-Elye
 David Hutchinson
 Papa John King
 George Sweetnam

Long John Baldry albums
2009 live albums